Lamontélarié is a commune in the Tarn department in southern France.

Geography
Lamontélarié is located at the limits of Hérault on the Monts de Lacaune.  It is part of the Haut-Languedoc Regional Nature Park. It is about 1 hour and 35 minutes from Albi Castres.

See also
Communes of the Tarn department

References

Communes of Tarn (department)